Sir Everard Ferdinand im Thurn  (9 May 1852 – 9 October 1932) was an author, explorer, botanist, photographer and British colonial administrator. He was Governor of Fiji in the years 1904–1910.

Life 
Im Thurn was born in Camberwell, London, the son of an Austrian immigrant banker, and educated at Marlborough College, University of Oxford, the University of Edinburgh, and the University of Sydney. His first book, dedicated to his headmaster, was a study of The Birds of Marlborough (1870). 

After his education, im Thurn travelled to British Guiana—called Guyana since its independence from Great Britain—to become (at the age of 25) curator of the British Guiana Museum from 1877 until 1882. He later became a stipendiary magistrate in Pomeroon.

In December 1884 he led the first successful expedition to the summit of Mount Roraima, in Venezuela's Gran Sabana region, along with Harry Perkins, an Assistant Crown Surveyor who was also living in British Guiana. He was a keen photographer and author of several works related to his expedition to Roraima, which were published in scientific journals, including: "The Botany of Roraima Expedition of 1884: being notes on the plants observed; with a list of the species collected, and determinations of those that are new" (Linnean Society, 1887), and "Among the Indians of Guiana: being sketches, chiefly anthropologic from the interior of British Guiana, etc.", which includes detailed observations of the Pemon Indians of Venezuela. Im Thurn went on to become a government agent in British Guiana from 1891 to 1899, and was employed on the Venezuelan boundary commission 1897–99, for which he was appointed a Companion of the Order of the Bath (CB) in the 1900 New Year Honours list on 1 January 1900 (the order was gazetted on 16 January 1900), and was invested by Queen Victoria at Windsor Castle on 1 March 1900. 

He then spent a couple of years back in the United Kingdom, holding several positions from 1899 to 1901, including 1st class clerk and later principal clerk in the Colonial Office. In July 1901 he moved to Ceylon (now Sri Lanka), where he was appointed colonial secretary and lieutenant-governor. He ended his colonial career as Governor of Fiji  from 1904 to 1910, during which time he was knighted as a Knight Commander of the Order of St Michael and St George (KCMG) in the 1905 Birthday Honours. He was appointed a Knight Commander of the Order of the British Empire (KBE) in the 1918 New Year Honours, at which time he was vice-chairman of the King George and Queen Mary's Club for Overseas Forces.

He was a well-respected figure in the scientific circles of his time. Whilst in Ceylon he served as president of the Ceylon Branch of the Royal Asiatic Society from 1902 to 1904. He was later elected president of the Royal Anthropological Institute 1919–1920 and made an Honorary Fellow of Exeter College, Oxford. 

In 1895 he married Hannah C. Lorimer, daughter of Professor James Lorimer, of the University of Edinburgh. In 1921 they moved to live at Cockenzie House in East Lothian, where he died in 1932. 

In 1886, he was honoured by English botanist Henry Nicholas Ridley, who named a genus of plants from tropical South America after him. The genus of Everardia (is in the family Cyperaceae).

References

This article contains content from the defunct wiki, Hierarchypedia, used here under the GNU Free Documentation License.
Im Thurn, E.F. (1885). The Ascent of Mount Roraima. Proceedings of the Royal Geographic Society VII: 497–521.

External links

Account of Im Thurn's 1884 ascent of Roraima

|-

1852 births
1932 deaths
Alumni of the University of Oxford
Alumni of the University of Edinburgh
University of Sydney alumni
Fellows of Exeter College, Oxford
Alumni of Exeter College, Oxford
History of Guyana
English writers
English botanists
English explorers
Photographers from London
High Commissioners for the Western Pacific
Governors of Fiji
Members of the Legislative Council of Fiji
British Guiana people
Chief Secretaries of Ceylon
Companions of the Order of the Bath
Knights Commander of the Order of St Michael and St George
Knights Commander of the Order of the British Empire
English people of Swiss descent
Fellows of the Royal Anthropological Institute of Great Britain and Ireland
Presidents of the Royal Anthropological Institute of Great Britain and Ireland